The 2018–19 Northeastern Huskies women's basketball team represents the Northeastern University during the 2018–19 NCAA Division I women's basketball season. The Huskies, led by fifth year head coach Kelly Cole, play their home games at the Cabot Center and were members of the Colonial Athletic Association (CAA). They finished the season 20–12, 9–9 CAA play to finish in sixth place. They advanced to the semifinals of the CAA women's tournament where they lost to Drexel. They received an at-large bid of the WNIT where they lost to Butler in the first round.

Roster

Schedule

|-
!colspan=9 style=| Non-conference regular season

|-
!colspan=9 style=| CAA regular season

|-
!colspan=9 style=| CAA Women's Tournament

|-
!colspan=9 style=| WNIT

See also
2018–19 Northeastern Huskies men's basketball team

References

Northeastern Huskies women's basketball seasons
Northeastern
Northeastern